Paul Mendelson (born 14 January 1965) is a British Crime fiction novelist and Contract Bridge and Poker author.

His first novel The First Rule of Survival was shortlisted for CWA Goldsboro Gold Dagger 2014. The follow-up, The Serpentine Road, published in 2015 was long listed for CWA Goldsboro Gold Dagger 2015. His third novel, The History of Blood was published in 2016. His fourth novel was Apostle Lodge, published in 2018. He has written extensively on bridge, on which he is considered a leading author, and is the columnist for the Financial Times and many other publications.

Writing works

Published novels 
The First Rule of Survival, Constable & Robinson, 2014
The Serpentine Road, Constable Crime, 2015
The History of Blood, Constable Crime, 2016
Apostle Lodge, Constable Crime, 2018

Other published works
Mendelson's Guide to the Bidding Battle. Cambridge, UK: Colt Books, 1998. .Bridge for Beginners: A Step-By-Step Guide To One Of The Most Challenging Card Games, Lyons Press, 2004Texas Hold 'Em Poker: Begin and Win, Elliot Right Way Books, 2005Texas Hold'em Poker: Win Online, Elliot Right Way Books, 2007Bridge: Winning Ways to Play Your Cards, Right Way, 2008The Mammoth Book of Poker (Mammoth Books), Running Press, 2008Control the Bidding: The Right Way to Secure the Battleground in Bridge, Elliot Right Way Books, 2008The Right Way to Play Bridge, Right Way, 2008The Mammoth Book of Casino Games, Running Press, 2010Mendelson's Guide to Duplicate Bridge, Dolman Scott Ltd, 2011121 Tips for Better Bridge, Ebury Press, 2011The Golden Rules Of Bridge'', How To Books Ltd, 2014

References

External links

Author Interview: Writer finds muse in SA
The First Rule of Survival by Paul Mendelson- Crime Review
  
 

1965 births
Living people
Writers from London
English thriller writers
English crime fiction writers
British gambling writers